Rockers Hi-Fi were an electronic dub/dance outfit formed in Birmingham, England in 1991 as Original Rockers. In 1994, they changed their name to Rockers Hi-Fi. Their music was quite popular across Europe as an extension and continuation of the dub music genre.

Their first success came with a few tracks on the Beyond Records Ambient Dub series of compilations, and "Push Push" became a dancefloor hit at the beginning of the 90s.

They released four studio albums and also mixed and compiled an album for Studio !K7's DJ-Kicks series.

Their urban sound was created by Richard "DJ Dick" Whittingham who began his DJ career in Duran Duran's Rum Runner nightclub, he now hosts Leftfoot at the Medicine Bar, and Glyn "Bigga" Bush who continues to produce music as BiggaBush and Lightning Head on his own Lion Head label.

Their song "What a Life!" was part of the soundtrack for the 1995 film The Basketball Diaries, and "Going Under (Love & Insanity Dub) (K&D Sessions)" featured in the 2000s film Traffic, as well as in the mid-season finale to the first season of the television series The O.C.

In 1992, Richard Whittingham and Glyn Bush founded the label Different Drummer, releasing music from both Original Rockers/Rockers Hi-Fi and others.

Discography Original Rockers
 Push Push (single) (1991), The Cake Label
 Rockers to Rockers (released 1993 on Different Drummer, with four different tracks compared to the 1995 Rockers Hi-Fi re-release.

Discography Rockers Hi-Fi
 Rockers to Rockers (Recorded 1993, released 1995, 4th & Broadway / Gee Street Records)
 Push Push (single) (1995) 4th & Broadway
 Mish Mash (25 March 1997, WEA Records)
 Going Under (the Kruder & Dorfmeister Sessions EP) (single) 1997, Different Drummer / WEA
 DJ-Kicks: The Black Album (19 May 1997, Studio !K7)
 Overproof (1998, WEA Records)
 Times Up (1999, WEA Records)

External links
 BiggaBush

References

English dance music groups
English electronic music groups
British electronic dance music groups
Gee Street Records artists
Musical groups from Birmingham, West Midlands